Imre Mathesz (25 March 1937 – 6 December 2010) was a Hungarian football player and coach.

Career

Playing career
Mathesz, who played as a midfielder, played club football for Vasas SC.

Mathesz represented Hungary at the 1966 FIFA World Cup, making two appearances in qualifying and two in the tournament itself. Mathesz also played in two qualifying games for the 1968 European Championship.

Coaching career
After retiring as a player, Mathesz became a football manager, and took charge of Kaposvári Rákóczi in 1973.

Later life and death
Matesz died in a car crash on 6 December 2010, at the age of 73.

References

1937 births
2010 deaths
Hungarian footballers
Hungary international footballers
Hungarian football managers
Vasas SC players
1966 FIFA World Cup players
Road incident deaths in Hungary
Footballers from Budapest
Association football midfielders